Karl Jordan (born 15 November 1894, date of death unknown) was an Austrian footballer. He played in three matches for the Austria national football team from 1916 to 1917.

References

External links
 

1894 births
Year of death missing
Austrian footballers
Austria international footballers
Place of birth missing
Association footballers not categorized by position